Parides childrenae, the green-celled cattleheart, is a species of butterfly in the family Papilionidae. It is found in southern North America and northern South America.

Description
The upperside of the wings is black. The male has a bright green patch and a small pale yellow subapical spot on the forewing. There is a red patch on the hindwing. The female has a small white patch on the trailing edge of the forewing and a few pale subapical spots. There is a band of red spots across the hindwing. The underside of the wings is also black. The male has small pale subapical spots on the forewing and a few red spots on the hindwing. The female's underside is the same as the upper side.

Description from Seitz

P. childrenae. The green area of the male is larger than in P. sesostris, covering also
a part of the cell. The female has a transverse row of spots before the apex of the forewing, as well as two spots on the
disc posteriorly. Distributed from Guatemala to Ecuador in two subspecies. — childrenae ' Gray (3 a) is the 
Central American form, which is found from Guatemala to Panama. Forewing of the male with a white spot
before the apex. Band on the hindwing of the female bright red. — oedippus Luc. has in the male no white spot
before the apex of the forewing, or only a very small one. In the female the band on the hindwing is a somewhat
yellowish red on the inner side. Colombia and Ecuador.

Description from Rothschild and Jordan(1906)

A full description is provided by Rothschild, W. and Jordan, K. (1906)

Taxonomy
Parides childrenae is a member of the sesostris species group

The members are
Parides childrenae 
Parides sesostris

Etymology
The name honours Mrs Children

References

Lewis, H.L. (1974). Butterflies of the World  Page 26, figure 4

External links

 Parides childrenae at funet.fi

childrenae
Butterflies of North America
Butterflies of Central America
Papilionidae of South America
Taxa named by George Robert Gray
Butterflies described in 1832